Bayu Pradana Andriatmoko (born 19 April 1991) is an Indonesian professional footballer who plays as a defensive midfielder for Liga 1 club Barito Putera.

Career statistics

Club

International

Honours

International
Indonesia
 AFF Championship runner-up: 2016

Individual
 Liga 1 Best XI: 2017
 Indonesia Soccer Championship A Best XI: 2016

References

External links
 Bayu Pradana at Liga Indonesia
 

Indonesian footballers
People from Salatiga
Living people
1991 births
Persis Solo players
Persipasi Bekasi players
Kalteng Putra F.C. players
Persiba Balikpapan players
Mitra Kukar players
PS Barito Putera players
Indonesian Premier Division players
Indonesian Premier League players
 Liga 1 (Indonesia) players
Indonesia youth international footballers
Indonesia international footballers
Association football midfielders
Association football central defenders
Sportspeople from Central Java